Dornes may refer to:
 Dornes, Nièvre, France (commune)
 Dornes Parish, Portugal